The Copa Luis Villarejo is an association football in Puerto Rico. Created in 2016, it is open to all clubs that are affiliated with the Puerto Rican Football Federation.

History

1st cup
A new domestic cup tournament, the Copa Luis Villarejo, was inaugurated and involved teams from the Liga Nacional de Fútbol de Puerto Rico (LNF), the second tier Puerto Rico Soccer League (PRSL), as well as Puerto Rico FC of the North American Soccer League (NASL), a second tier league sanctioned by the United States Soccer Federation. 

On November 17 2016, Puerto Rico FC (PRFC) escaped with a 1-0 win over Bayamón FC (BFC) in the second leg to complete a 4–0 aggregate victory in the semifinal round of the First Luis Villarejo Cup, Senior Men's category, of the Puerto Rican Football Federation (FPF). The victory, sealed with a penalty goal by its captain, Cristiano Dias, in the 44th minute, gave the PRFC a ticket to the Cup championship game at Estadio Juan Ramón Loubriel de Bayamón against the Criollos, who come from struggling, aggregate 5–4, to Metropolitan FC.  

PRFC also joined the Criollos as teams with tickets secured to represent Puerto Rico in the 2017 Champions League Cup of the Caribbean Football Union (CFU), which is qualifying for the Champions League 2017–18 Confederation of North, Central America and Caribbean Football (CONCACAF). 

On November 20 2016, Puerto Rico FC defeated the Criollos de Caguas FC 4–1 to become the cups 1st ever champion, with 3 goals coming from the Puerto Rican striker Hector Ramos, and one coming from "Georgie" to seal the deal in the 88th minute.

2nd edition suspended
On August 16 2017, The president of the Competitions Commission of the Puerto Rican Football Federation (FPF), Alberto Santiago; announced the 2nd edition of the Luis Villarejo Cup is scheduled to begin in mid-September of this year. Recalling that the PRFC also had administrative failings and that it had to pay a substantial fine to finally be able to compete. This year the FPF is advancing the celebration of the Cup to avoid those consequences. The format will remain the same as simple elimination in round-trip series.

On September 3, 2017, The Puerto Rican Football Federation (FPF) announced it was ready to celebrate the annual Luis Villarejo Cup starting this September with 6 registered clubs. The clubs being last years champion, Puerto Rico FC, Bayamón FC, Caguas Sporting FC, Metropolitan Football Academy, Mayaguez FC, and newcomer to the tournament Club Deportivo Barbosa . The FPF will be holding the congress of the Cup on Wednesday, September 6, if there is no time against Hurricane Irma. On Wednesday, other clubs, such as Don Bosco FC (Puerto Rico), and others who did not submit everything required before the closing of the call could enter.

On September 29, the FBF announced the 2nd Luis Villarejo Cup will be suspended, due to the devastation left by Hurricane Maria that had left the entire island powerless. The Federation was looking to restart the cup in November, if all teams are available.

2nd cup 
On February 12, 2019, the Puerto Rico Football Federation announced that the cup was coming back for its second edition.

Past winners and results

Yearly winner

Team results

Players records

Career goals

References

Football competitions in Puerto Rico
2016 establishments in Puerto Rico